Putney Arts Theatre ("PAT") is based in Putney, in the London Borough of Wandsworth and operates as a community space specialising in theatre productions.

The Putney Arts Theatre stands in the Union Chapel built by Sir Samuel Morton Peto in the late 19th century. After the original congregation fell dissolved, the London City Council acquired the building.

In 1968, the theatre troupe Group 64 leased the Union Chapel in Putney from the London City Council. Group 64 purchased the building in 1998 and renamed it the Putney Arts Theatre. The opening production was attended by Sir John Mills, a patron of the theatre.

Group 64 Youth Theatre is the resident Youth Theatre Group, and Putney Theatre Company is the resident Adult Theatre Group.

In 2017, the theatre was renovated.

The Putney Arts Theatre is a registered charity.

References

External links 
 
  
 
 

Theatres in the London Borough of Wandsworth
Putney